Yassine Otmane Benrahou (born 24 January 1999) is a professional footballer who plays as midfielder for Prva HNL side Hajduk Split. Born in France, he previously represented France and Morocco at youth international level.

Club career
On 6 August 2018, Benrahou signed his first professional contract with Bordeaux, keeping him at the club for three seasons. He made his professional debut with in a 3–2 Ligue 1 loss to Lyon on 26 April 2019.

Benrahou joined Nîmes permanently in June 2020, after he spent the second half of the 2019–20 season on loan at the club. He signed a three-year contract, while Nîmes paid a transfer fee of €1.5 million to Bordeaux.

On 26 January 2023, Benrahou joined Hajduk Split signing a contract until summer 2026 with an option for one more year.

International career
Benrahou was born in France to a Moroccan father and Algerian mother. A former youth international for France, he switched and represented the Morocco U20s in a pair of 2019 Africa U-20 Cup of Nations qualification matches in March 2018.

References

External links
 
 
 
 
 
 CAF Profile

1999 births
Living people
People from Le Blanc-Mesnil
Moroccan people of Algerian descent
French sportspeople of Moroccan descent
French sportspeople of Algerian descent
Moroccan footballers
French footballers
Footballers from Seine-Saint-Denis
Association football midfielders
Morocco youth international footballers
France youth international footballers
Ligue 1 players
Ligue 2 players
Championnat National 2 players
Championnat National 3 players
Croatian Football League players
INF Clairefontaine players
Paris Saint-Germain
FC Girondins de Bordeaux players
Nîmes Olympique players
HNK Hajduk Split players
Moroccan expatriate footballers
Expatriate footballers in Croatia
Moroccan expatriate sportspeople in Croatia